Al-Azhom Grand Mosque is a congregational mosque in the city of Tangerang, Banten, Indonesia. Opened in 2003, it is the largest mosque in Banten province and one of the largest mosques in the world in terms of the worshipper capacity.

Description
The groundbreaking for this mosque was carried out by the Mayor of Tangerang Djakaria Machmud on July 7, 1997. The mosque was inaugurated by the Minister of Religion of the Republic of Indonesia Said Agil Husin Al Munawar on February 28, 2003.

The facilities consist of male/female ablution rooms, mihrab and preparation rooms, male/female prayer rooms, study rooms, library rooms, office space and equipment/mosque yard. The main dome on top is supported by surrounding 4 semi-circular domes. Because of this architectural combination, there is no need for poles to support the dome which creates an spacious impression of the prayer space.

Gallery

References

Buildings and structures in Banten
Mosques completed in 1997
Mosques in Indonesia
Tangerang